The 2013 Tour of Beijing was the third running of the Tour of Beijing stage race. It started on 11 October in Beijing's Shunyi District and ended on 15 October at the Bird’s Nest Piazza after five stages. It was the 29th and final race of the 2013 UCI World Tour season. Beñat Intxausti of the  won the race after his mountain–top–finish victory on stage 4.

Schedule

Participating teams
As the Tour of Beijing is a UCI World Tour event, all nineteen UCI ProTeams were invited automatically and obligated to send a squad. In addition the race organisers awarded a wildcard place to the  team.

The twenty teams that competed in the race were:

Stages

Stage 1
11 October 2013 — Shunyi to Huairou Studio City,

Stage 2
12 October 2013 — Huairou Studio City to Yanqing,

Stage 3
13 October 2013 — Yanqing to Qianjiandian,

Stage 4
14 October 2013 — Yanqing to Mentougou Miaofeng Mountain,

Stage 5
15 October 2013 — Tiananmen Square to Bird’s Nest Piazza,

Classification leadership table

References

External links

2013 UCI World Tour
2013
2013 in Chinese sport
2010s in Beijing